Lott Cary (also in records as Lott Carey and Lott Gary) (1780 – November 10, 1828) was an African-American Baptist minister and lay physician who was a missionary leader in the founding of the colony of Liberia on the west coast of Africa in the 1820s. He founded the first Baptist church there in 1822, now known as Providence Baptist Church of Monrovia. He served as the colony's acting governor from August 1828 to his death in November of that year.

Life 
Born into slavery in Charles City County, Virginia, Carey purchased his freedom and that of his children at the age of 33 after saving money from being hired out by his master in Richmond. He became a supervisor in a tobacco warehouse, as the city was a major port for the export of that commodity crop.

He emigrated in 1821 with his family to the new colony of Liberia, founded by the American Colonization Society for the resettlement of free people of color and free blacks from the United States. Cary was one of the first black American missionaries, and the first American Baptist missionary to Africa. He established the colony's first church, founded schools for natives, and helped lead the colony.

Early life and education 
In 1780 Lott Cary was born into slavery and humble surroundings in Charles City County, Virginia, on the plantation of John Bowry.

In 1804, his master, a planter and Methodist minister, hired Cary out in Virginia's capital city of Richmond, about 25 miles away. Bowry had arranged a one year-long contract for Cary to work at the Shockoe tobacco warehouse.

In 1807 Cary joined the First Baptist Church of Richmond, a congregation that included whites and African Americans. During the second Great Awakening and religious revivals of this period, Baptist and Methodist preachers recruited slaves into their congregations. Cary was baptized by its pastor, John Courtney.

Cary learned to read the Bible and later attended a small school for slaves. Its twenty young men were taught by Deacon William Crane. He had come from Newark, New Jersey in 1812, opened a shoe store, and joined the First Baptist Church. Crane's students met three evenings each week to learn reading, writing, arithmetic, and the Bible.

Cary rose went from working as a common laborer to shipping clerk and supervisor of a tobacco warehouse on Tobacco Row in Richmond. Cary was sometimes rewarded by his master with five-dollar bills from the money he earned. He was also permitted to collect and sell small bags of waste tobacco for his own profit.

Freedom and career
In 1813, Cary's first wife died. The same year Cary used his savings to purchase his freedom and that of their two children for $850. 

As a free man, he continued to be both industrious and frugal. He and his family stayed in Richmond; many jobs were available and the city had a growing free black community. In 1813 Cary became an official Baptist minister. He also became a lay medical practitioner while in Richmond.

In 1815, he and Collin Teague helped form the African Baptist Missionary Society in Richmond.

American Colonization Society 

In the early 19th century, about 2 million African Americans lived in the United States, of whom 200,000 were free, mostly located in the North. The states of the Upper South, especially Virginia, Maryland and Delaware, also had an increasing number of free blacks in this period. For the first 20 years after the Revolutionary War, some slaveholders freed their slaves to uphold ideals of liberty and in other cases in response to the appeals of preachers active in the Second Great Awakening, who supported the abolition of slavery.

Believing that free blacks threatened the stability of their slave society, in 1816 Virginia politician Charles Fenton Mercer and the Reverend Robert Finley founded the American Colonization Society (ACS) with the goal of enabling free blacks and former slaves to emigrate to Africa and establish a colony.  By this time most enslaved and free blacks were native-born in the United States, often for generations. They wanted to enjoy the rights of free people in the country where they had grown up and had family and social ties. Members of the ACS supported a goal of "repatriation" of blacks to Africa.

The Society was supported by a coalition of philanthropists, members of the clergy,
abolitionists, and slaveholders. Those favoring abolition wanted to free enslaved blacks and provide them with the chance to go to Africa to escape continuing discrimination in the United States. The slaveholders wanted to expel free blacks  from the South and the United States to remove what they perceived as a threat to the stability of their slave societies.

The ACS established the colony of Liberia on the coast in West Africa in 1819. Cary was among numerous free blacks who became interested in this movement. In 1819, The American Colonization Society published the Journal of Samuel John Mills along with “Letters from Africa to Persons of Color in the United States.” Cary's first biographer describes how the journal and letters, which invited "the free colored people of the United States to come and join them" produced "an immediate determination in Lott Cary and Collin Teague to remove to Africa."

Colony of Liberia 

By 1821, Cary had accumulated a sum to pay for his and his second wife's expenses for transportation to the new colony of Liberia on the African coast. He was giving up his property, purchased in Henrico County, and a good income.

When asked why he would leave a community in which he was respected and led a comfortable life, he replied: 'I am an African, and in this country, however meritorious my conduct, and 'respectable' my character, I cannot receive the credit due to either. I wish to go to a country where I shall be estimated by my merits, not by my complexion; and I feel bound to labor for my suffering race.'

His work in Liberia was supported by the First Baptist Church of Richmond, the American Baptist Foreign Missions Society, and the African Baptist Missionary Society of Richmond, of which he was a co-founder. Cary became the first black American missionary to Africa.

In the new colony, Cary served as pastor, counselor, and physician. His second wife died of disease shortly after they arrived in Liberia. He married again, but in its November 5, 1825 article about the colony and Cary's life, the New York Observer reported that Cary's third wife had died; she was "the daughter of Richard Sampson, from Petersburg, Virginia."

After arrival, Cary quickly established Providence Baptist Church in Cape Montserado. The settlement later was designated as the capital and renamed Monrovia. In 1822 he helped mount the defense of the new colony against 1,500 natives. He  founded several schools to teach Christianity to natives in the interior. In 1826, Cary was elected vice-agent of the ACS.

Early life in the Colony of Liberia was harsh and dangerous. The native Mandé and other ethnic tribes resisted the colonization and expansion by the American settlers, and many armed conflicts took place between the groups. The colonists were also at risk of raids from slave traders, who would have sold the blacks into slavery. In addition, they suffered tropical diseases until the colony could develop better housing and sanitation.

In March 1828, Cary became acting vice-agent of the Colony. He had been designated as successor by the colonial agent Jehudi Ashmun before his death. Later that year Cary was wounded in an accident and died two days later on November 10, 1828. He and seven companions were fatally injured by an explosion while they were making bullets.

Legacy and honors
 The Lott Carey Foreign Mission Convention, based in Washington, DC, has continued his work.  
 The Lott Cary House in Charles City County is a designated state historical landmark; it was added to the National Register of Historic Places in 1980. Today the much altered house is used as a private residence. Virginia historical marker, V27-Lott Cary Birthplace, notes the site at the intersection of Virginia State Highways 155 and 602. Little is left of the original 18th-century house, which was likely John Bowry's plantation house. There is a strong oral tradition in the black community that this was Cary's birthplace. The site is marked historically in order to represent the man and his achievements, as well as the significance of blacks in Virginia history. 
 Lott Cary Road in Charles City County was named in his honor. 
 The Board of Supervisors of neighboring James City County, Virginia declared March 21, 2001, to be "Lott Cary Day" in his honor.
 In Richmond, the Carytown shopping district was named for him. 
 Careysburg, on the outskirts of Monrovia, was named for him.
 Providence Baptist Church in Monrovia, Liberia celebrated its 175th anniversary in 2001.
 In 2015 Cary was posthumously honored as one of the Library of Virginia's "Strong Men & Women in Virginia History".
 Lott Carey Baptist Secondary School, Afaha Obio Eno, Ibiono Ibom, Nigeria is named after him.

See also
History of Liberia

References

Attribution

Further reading
Gurley, Ralph Randolph. Life of Jehudi Ashmun, Washington, DC: 1835.
Russell, John H. The Free Negro in Virginia, 1619-1865, Baltimore: 1913.
Taylor, James Barnett. Biography of Elder Lott Cary, Late Missionary to Africa, Baltimore: 1837.
White, Blanche Sydnor, compiler. First Baptist Church, Richmond, 1780-1955.

External links
Ralph Randolph Gurley, "Sketch of the Life of Lott Cary", in Life of Jehudi Ashmun, Late Colonial Agent in Liberia. With An Appendix, Containing Extracts from his Journal and Other Writings; 1835, online at Documenting the South, University of North Carolina 
Liberia – "Liberia", Catholic Encyclopedia (1907). Includes a biography of Lott Carey from the New York Observer of November 5, 1825.
Biography of Lott Cary, Library of Virginia's "Strong Men & Women in Virginia History" website

1780 births
1828 deaths
Agents and Governors of Liberia
Baptist missionaries from the United States
Americo-Liberian people
18th-century American slaves
People from Charles City County, Virginia
Baptist missionaries in Liberia
History of Richmond, Virginia
Religious leaders from Richmond, Virginia
Southern Baptist ministers
African-American physicians
African-American Baptist ministers
African-American missionaries
American emigrants to Liberia
Baptists from Virginia
American colonization movement
19th-century American slaves
American evangelicals